The Anglican Diocese of Northern Izon is one of twelve within the Anglican Province of the Niger Delta, itself one of 14 provinces within the Church of Nigeria. The current bishop is Funkuro Godrules Victor Amgbare. The first bishop, Fred Anga Nyanabo, was consecrated on May 14, 2008 at St James's Cathedral, Oke-Bola, Ibadan and the missionary diocese was inaugurated on June 5 at St Mark's Cathedral, Kaiama, Bayelsa State.

Notes

Church of Nigeria dioceses
Dioceses of the Province of Niger Delta